Samarjit Neogi was an Indian cricketer who played for Assam.

Neogi made a single first-class appearance, during the 1989-90 Ranji Trophy competition, against Orissa. Batting in the upper-middle order, Neogi scored 46 runs in the first innings - the second highest individual score of the innings - and 4 runs in the second.

External links
Samarjit Neogi at CricketArchive 

Indian cricketers
Assam cricketers
Living people
Year of birth missing (living people)